Serlby Park Academy is a mixed all-through school and sixth form located in the twin villages of Bircotes and Harworth in North Nottinghamshire. The school also serves the nearby towns of Serlby, Styrrup, Blyth, Misson, among others.

It is part of the Delta Academies Trust, along with several other schools and academies in the area.

Facilities 
As of 2016, the school operates from one purpose built site containing all students from infant and nursery (ages 3–7), primary (ages 7–11), and secondary (ages 11–16) stages of education. Serlby Park is also part of (and one of the sites making up) the Doncaster Collegiate Sixth Form, which provides the education provision for students aged 16–18.

Academic performance 
OFSTED currently rates this school "Good", noting that at the moment the school has 831 registered pupils, with capacity for up to 1230.

History
The school was established in September 2005 as a result of the amalgamation of three schools Bircotes and Harworth Community School (secondary), North Border Junior School, and North Border Infant and Nursery School. Before the school acquired funding for the new building, there had been an attempt in 2009 to close the secondary school to fill places at Retford Oaks Academy,  a school approximately 10 miles away from the existing site.

References

External links
 School website
Delta Academies Trust website
Doncaster Collegiate Sixth Form website

Secondary schools in Nottinghamshire
Educational institutions established in 2005
Academies in Nottinghamshire
Primary schools in Nottinghamshire
Delta schools
2005 establishments in England